Franklin Francis Ayodele Amankwa, better known simply as Franklin or Frenklin (born 24 August 1987 in Gusau) is a Nigerian football striker playing with Hajer Club in the Saudi Professional League.

Career
He played with a number of Nigerian clubs and Ivorian Africa Sports, before signing, in 2008, with Serbian club FK Loznica. After only one season there, he moved to the newly promoted Serbian SuperLiga club FK Mladi Radnik where he has been a standard first team choice, scoring goals mostly with headers. After one Season in Serbian SuperLiga, FK Mladi Radnik was relegated to Serbian First League, Franklin was one of the players released by the club after relegation.

In the summer of 2010 Franklin had a trial at Diósgyőri VTK.

In summer 2011 he moved to Saudi Arabia to play with the newly promoted Saudi top flight Hajer Club.

References

External sources
 Franklin Ayodele Amankwa at Srbijafudbal.

1987 births
Living people
Nigerian footballers
Nigerian expatriate footballers
Association football forwards
Ifeanyi Ubah F.C. players
Akwa United F.C. players
Africa Sports d'Abidjan players
Expatriate footballers in Ivory Coast
FK Loznica players
FK Mladi Radnik players
Serbian SuperLiga players
Expatriate footballers in Serbia
Expatriate footballers in Saudi Arabia
Hajer FC players
Saudi Professional League players
Nigerian expatriate sportspeople in Ivory Coast
Nigerian expatriate sportspeople in Saudi Arabia